Venetia Kotta (1897 or 1901 – 1945) was a Greek archaeologist, museum curator, and Byzantine historian from Sampsunta in the former Ottoman Empire.

Early life and education
Venetia Kotta was born in 1897 or 1901 in Sampsunta, then part of the Ottoman Empire. Her parents belonged to the Pontus region's Greek-speaking minority.

Kotta completed her high school education in Russia. Later, she ran a girls' school for Romanian Greeks in Bucharest. During the 1920s, she went to universities in Athens and Paris. She studied the Byzantines under Gabriel Millet and earned a PhD while attending school in Paris.

Career
In 1933, Kotta applied for a job at the University of Thessaloniki, aiming to teach a course about the people's public and private lives in Byzantine times. Her application was rejected, possibly on the basis of her gender.

In the 1930s, Kotta became involved with Greece's archaeological community. She wrote for the Archaiologiki Ephimeris, one of Greece's prominent archaeological journals. In the journal's 1937 edition, Kotta published a piece about a rare icon of Mary. That same year, she was a member of the Archaeological Society of Athens.

During the early 1900s, though the sciences in Greece were male-dominated, some women entered careers as archaeologists. In the decades between WWI and WWII, two women were appointed to the state-run Greek Archaeological Service. Contemporary activist Avra Theodoropoulou called their promotion a "feminist victory". 

After the authoritarian Prime Minister Ioannis Metaxas came to power in 1936, a law was passed which forbade women from joining the Archaeological Service. Women already employed there could continue to work, but they couldn't become the directors of museums or archaeological programs. No women joined the Service until the law was abolished in 1955, with two exceptions. 

Venetia Kotta was one such exception. She joined the Archaeological Service under the special circumstance of WWII. She worked in the Byzantine Museum for over a decade. She became a curator of the Byzantine Museum in 1943, specializing in Byzantine textiles and other handmade artifacts.

Kotta worked at the Byzantine Museum until her death in 1945.

Writing
Venetia Kotta wrote about Byzantine art and philology.

Notes

References

People from Samsun
Greek women archaeologists
Greek archaeologists
20th-century archaeologists
Year of birth uncertain
1945 deaths
Pontic Greeks
Emigrants from the Ottoman Empire to Greece